The EastLink Trail is a shared use path for cyclists and pedestrians in the outer eastern/southeastern suburbs of Melbourne, Victoria, Australia. The trail gets its name from the EastLink tollway, along which it follows for most of its length from Ringwood to Dandenong, until it joins the Dandenong Creek Trail near the Dandenong Bypass bridge at the tri-suburban junction between Dandenong, Dandenong South and Keysborough.

Route 
The path passes through or near to:

 Mullum Mullum Valley, Ringwood Bypass, Schwerkolt Cottage, and Eastland (Mullum Mullum Creek Trail)
 Simpsons Park / Heatherdale Reserve Proclamation Park
 Koomba Park (briefly combined with Dandenong Creek Trail) and Wantirna Reserve
 Blind Creek / Llewellyn Park Complex and the Blind Creek Trail
 Nortons Park, Shepherds Bush, and Drummies Bridge Reserve
 Jells Park (including trail network) and Chesterfield Farm
 Corhanwarrbul Creek Wetlands, Dandenong Creek and Tirhatuatan Park (briefly rejoining the Dandenong Creek Trail between Wellington Road and EastLink-Dandenong Creek overpass)
 Fotheringham Reserve, Mile Creek, and Greaves Reserve

The trail ends after crossing the Dandenong Creek just upstream of the Dandenong bridge, where it permanently joins the Dandenong Creek Trail. The Dandenong Creek Trail then follows the creek along the EastLink tollway as far as Bangholme, where it then heads west to the National Watersports Complex, Patterson Lakes, Carrum Foreshore, the Bayside Trail and beyond.

Footbridges cross EastLink at a number of points along the trail, and another takes path users across the Princes Highway.

Two additional footbridges completed construction in 2009: a footbridge over Maroondah Highway and a 60 m footbridge over Burwood Highway at the intersection with Mountain Highway.

Connections 
The EastLink Trail connects to numerous other paths:
To the Mullum Mullum Creek Trail in the north and close by is the Koonung Creek Trail. Centrally it connects to the Blind Creek Trail just south of High Street and comes close to the Scotchmans Creek Trail. At Ferntree Gully Road it connects to the Ferny Creek Trail. In the south at Dandenong, it connects to the Dandenong Creek Trail.

Two sections of the EastLink Trail utilise sections of the older Dandenong Creek Trail.

References 

Bike rides around Melbourne 3rd edition, 2009, Julia Blunden, Open Spaces Publishing,

External links 

Walking and Cycling Trails in Melbourne at Google Maps (see Eastern Melbourne → EastLink Trail)

Bike paths in Melbourne